The .40-50 Sharps may refer to either of two mutually incompatible firearms cartridges, which were the smallest members of the line of cartridges in the Sharps family:

.40-50 Sharps Straight or 40-1-inch Sharps, introduced in 1879
.40-50 Sharps Necked (or Bottlenecked) or 40-1-inch Sharps, introduced in 1869

References

Pistol and rifle cartridges
Sharps cartridges